The Imperial Dynasty restaurant was a gourmet restaurant in Hanford, California. The restaurant was founded in 1883 in Hanford's Chinatown, and was run by the same family for four generations, having started as a simple noodle house in the 19th century.

Richard Wing combined French and Chinese cooking in the 1960s to create one of the first fusion cuisines. The restaurant closed in early 2006 due to the declining health of the owner, who died in 2010 at the age of 89.

China Alley
China Alley, where the restaurant was located, was listed as one of the 11 most endangered historic places in America in 2011 by the National Trust for Historic Preservation.

See also
 List of Chinese restaurants
 Taoist Temple (Hanford, California)

References

External links

visithanford.com
PinotFile: End of an (Imperial) Dynasty

Defunct restaurants in California
Hanford, California
Chinese-American culture in California
French-American culture in California
History of Kings County, California
Restaurants established in 1883
Restaurants disestablished in 2006
1883 establishments in California
2006 disestablishments in California
Companies based in Kings County, California
Cuisine of the Western United States
Chinese fusion cuisine
French fusion cuisine
Defunct Chinese restaurants in the United States
Defunct French restaurants in the United States